The Pakistan women's national cricket team toured Australia in January 2023 to play three Women's One Day Internationals (WODIs) and three Women's Twenty20 Internationals (WT20Is). The WODI matches formed part of the 2022–2025 ICC Women's Championship.

Squads

Aimen Anwar, Javeria Khan and Tuba Hassan were named as travelling reserves for Pakistan's WODI squad, whilst Ghulam Fatima, Kainat Imtiaz and Sadaf Shamas were named as travelling reserves in the WT20I squad. On 13 January, injured Alyssa Healy was ruled out of the WT20I series. On 21 January, Pakistan's Diana Baig was ruled out of the WT20I series due to a fractured finger, with Sadaf Shamas added to the squad.

Tour match

WODI series

1st WODI

2nd WODI

3rd WODI

WT20I series

1st WT20I

2nd WT20I

3rd WT20I

References

Further reading

External links
 Series home at ESPNcricinfo

2023 in Australian cricket
2023 in Australian women's sport
2022–23 Australian women's cricket season
2023 in Pakistani cricket
International cricket competitions in 2022–23
2022-23
Pakistan 2022-23